Robert M. Miller (born March 4, 1927) is an equine behaviorist and veterinarian, best recognized for his system of training newborn foals known as imprint training. Miller is also one of the early adopters and promoters of Natural horsemanship.  His work is often referred to by natural horsemanship clinicians.  He has served as a judge in the annual Road to the Horse competition, and also is a co-founder of the "Light Hands Horsemanship" concept and annual clinic.

Early life
Miller was born in New York on March 4, 1927, and raised in Tucson, Arizona. After serving in the infantry overseas in World War II, he attended and graduated from the veterinary school at Colorado State University in 1956. He established the Conejo Valley Veterinary Clinic in Thousand Oaks, California in 1959.  Miller's experience with horses dates to his childhood and included work as a wrangler, trail guide, and rodeo hand.

Career
Miller has authored scientific papers and magazine articles for both veterinary journals and equine publications, and has published four books and six videos on equine behavior, health, and horsemanship. He has served on the editorial staff of Veterinary Medicine, for which he is best known for his long-running “Mind Over Miller” column, as well as Modern Veterinary Practice, Veterinary Forum, and Western Horseman magazines. He is also a cartoonist who has published seven cartoon books under the moniker "RMM".

Miller has received professional awards for his achievements in both veterinary medicine and equine behavior. In 2004, Miller was inducted into the Hall of Fame by the Western States Horse Expo, and is a recipient of the Bustad Companion Animal Veterinarian of the Year Award in 1995.

Miller retired from practice in 1987, in order to devote himself full-time to the teaching of equine behavior and to support the Natural horsemanship movement. He continues to travel and lecture and occasionally to defend the archaic practice of declawing.

Personal life
Miller resides on his ranch in Thousand Oaks, California with his wife, Debby. Additionally, he still keeps some animals, including dogs, horses, and mules, on his ranch.

Works

Books

Self-published books
The Passion For Horses & Artistic Talent - An Unrecognized Connection. Robert M Miller Communications. (2010) 
Yes, We Treat Aardvarks - Stories From An Extraordinary Veterinary Practice. Robert M Miller Communications. (2010) 
Handling Equine Patients - A Handbook For Veterinary Students & Veterinary Technicians. Robert M. Miller Communications. (2010) 
Ranchin', Ropin' an' Doctorin'. Robert M Miller Communications. (2011)

Commercially published
Natural horsemanship explained : from heart to hands. The Lyons Press, (2007) 
The Revolution in Horsemanship (and What It Means to Mankind), with Rick Lamb. The Lyons Press. (2005) 
Understanding the Ancient Secrets of the Horse's Mind. Russell Meerdink Company. (1999) 
Imprint Training of the Newborn Foal. Western Horseman Publishing. (2003  / 1991 Vintage )
Most of My Patients Are Animals. Paul Eriksson Publishing Company. (1987) 
Health Problems of the Horse. Western Horseman Publishing. (1967, Revised 1988)

Videos 
Lameness: Its Causes & Prevention (Video Velocity, 2012)
Safer Horsemanship (Video Velocity, 1999)
Understanding Horses (Video Velocity, 1999)
Early Learning (Video Velocity, 1995)
Control of the Horse - The Art Of Restraint (Video Horse World, 1994)
Imprint Training of the Foal (Palomine Productions, 1986)
Influencing the Horse's Mind (Palomine Productions, 1984)

References

Bibliography

External links
Robert Miller's official website
Miller's website for "RMM" cartoons

Living people
1927 births
People from Thousand Oaks, California
American horse trainers
Natural horsemanship